Dickkopf-related protein 2 is a protein in the Dickkopf family that in humans is encoded by the DKK2 gene.

This gene encodes a protein that is a member of the dickkopf family. The secreted protein contains two cysteine rich regions and is involved in embryonic development through its interactions with the Wnt signaling pathway.

It can act as either an agonist or antagonist of Wnt/beta-catenin signaling, depending on the cellular context and the presence of the co-factor kremen 2. Activity of this protein is also modulated by binding to the Wnt co-receptor LDL-receptor related protein 6 (LRP6).

See also 
 Hairy palms and soles

References

Further reading